The streaked flycatcher (Myiodynastes maculatus) is a passerine bird in the tyrant flycatcher family.

Description
The head is brown with a concealed yellow crown patch, white supercilium and dusky eye mask. The upperparts are brown with darker brown streaks on the back, rufous and white edges on the wings, and wide chestnut edges on the rump and tail. The underparts are yellowish-white streaked with brown.

Sexes are similar, but immature birds are brown where the adult is black. M. m. solitarius has black rather than brown streaking above and below. The streaked flycatcher is a conspicuous bird, with a noisy sqEEE-zip call.

It is very similar in appearance to the less widespread sulphur-bellied flycatcher. The streaked flycatcher has a heavier bill, lighter yellow belly, pink basal half of the lower mandible and creamy (not white) superciliary.

Distribution and habitat
This species breeds from eastern Mexico, Trinidad and Tobago south to Bolivia and Argentina. The southern subspecies M. m. solitarius migrates to Venezuela and the Guianas from March to September during the austral winter. It is found at the edges of forests and cocoa plantations. Common across its wide range, this species is not considered threatened by the IUCN.

Behaviour

Feeding
Streaked flycatchers eat a range of food items, mostly large insects (such as cicadas, locusts and beetles), but also lizards and berries. It perches on a high watchpoint from which it sallies forth to catch insects in mid-flight or off plants using a range of aerobatic maneuvers, and occasionally gleans prey from the vegetation. The wintering southern migrants seem to include a considerable amount of fruit in their diet, for example those of Tamanqueiro (Alchornea glandulosa) which they sometimes eat in quantity; fruit are typically ripped off in mid-hover. It occasionally follows mixed-species feeding flocks, pouncing from up in the trees on prey flushed by birds in the undergrowth.

Breeding
The nest is an open cup of twigs and grasses placed in a tree hollow or sometimes a bromeliad. The female builds the nest and incubates the typical clutch of two or three creamy-white eggs, which are marked with red-brown spots, for 16–17 days to hatching. Both sexes feed the chicks, which fledge in a further 18–21 days.

References

Further reading

External links

 
 
 Streaked flycatcher Photo at Robert Scanlon's "Birds of Panama" gallery
 
 

streaked flycatcher
Birds of Central America
Birds of South America
streaked flycatcher
streaked flycatcher